Thomas Somaster was a 16th century English priest.

Somaster was born at Painsford, Ashprington He was a Fellow of All Souls College, Oxford. He held the living at Cornwood. He was  Archdeacon of Cornwall from 1571 to 1603.

References

Fellows of All Souls College, Oxford
Archdeacons of Cornwall
16th-century English clergy
Clergy from Devon
People from South Hams (district)